Ruth Cecilia Hebard (born April 28, 1998) is an American professional basketball player for the Chicago Sky of the Women's National Basketball Association (WNBA). She played college basketball for the Oregon Ducks. While  at West Valley High School in Fairbanks, Alaska, Hebard was a three-time Gatorade State Player of the Year from 2013 to 2015, and two-time USA Today Alaska Player of the Year in 2015 and 2016.

Career

College career

2016–2017 season
As a member of a highly touted freshman class that also included future two-time national player of the year Sabrina Ionescu, Hebard averaged a team-best 14.9 points and 8.5 rebounds per game. On January 15, 2017 against no. 17 UCLA, Hebard recorded a season high 29 points on 11-of-15 shooting. She was named both All-Pac-12 Conference and Pac-12 all freshman in the same year; the 18th player in Pac-12 history to achieve the feat.

2017–2018 season
Hebard started 37 of Oregon's 38 games and helped the Ducks advanced to the Elite Eight in the NCAA tournament for the second year in a row. She averaged 17.6 points and a team high 9.0 rebounds per game. On February 9, 2018, Hebard scored a career high 30 points on 13-of-15 shooting and 14 rebounds in a game against Washington. In the same month, she set the NCAA men's and women's record for most consecutive made field goal attempts at 33. She was once again named All-Pac-12.

2018–2019 season
Hebard averaged 16.1 points and 9.1 rebounds per game for the season and helped the Ducks to their first ever Final Four in the NCAA tournament. She shot 67% from the floor for the second best shooting efficiency in NCAA, and was perfect in two games where she went 9-of-9 in a win against Air Force and 10-of-10 in a win against Colorado. She was named to the All-Pac-12 team for the third year in a row.

2019–2020 season
In a 104–46 rout of Colorado on January 3, 2020, Hebard scored 21 points and became the 12th player in Pac-12 history to surpass the 2,000 career points milestone. She joined Ionescu as the only two active Pac-12 players in the 2,000 club.

Professional career

WNBA
In the 2020 WNBA draft, the Chicago Sky selected Hebard with the 8th overall pick.

Overseas career

Nesibe Aydın
After her first WNBA season, Hebard signed to the newly promoted Nesibe Aydın of the Women's Basketball Super League. Her team finished the regular season on the third place, in the playoff they lost against Galatasaray in the semi-final after defeated 58-70 at the last game of the best of five series. Hebard best match in the regular season was at the round 9 against Beşiktaş when she scored 34 points and grabbed 20 rebounds. In the playoff her best game was the first match of the semifinal against Galatasaray, she scored 22 points and grabbed 14 rebounds when Nesibe won 71-68.

KSC Szekszárd
At the summer of 2022, Hebard signed to KSC Szekszárd whom played in the Nemzeti Bajnokság the top tier Hungarian women's basketball leagues, and the EuroLeague. She terminated her contract with the team in mid-February of 2023, for personal reasons.

Personal life
Hebard, who is African American, was born in Chicago. She was adopted by two white parents and grew up in Fairbanks, Alaska. She is the second of three children adopted by John and Dorothy Hebard. She is a Christian and a member of the Fellowship of Christian Athletes.

Career statistics

College

|-
| style="text-align:left;"| 2016–17
| style="text-align:left;"| Oregon
| 37 || 35 || 27.3 || .588 || .000 || .701 || 8.5 || 0.8 || 1.3 || 0.5 || 2.2 || 14.9
|-
| style="text-align:left;"| 2017–18
| style="text-align:left;"| Oregon
| 37 || 37 || 30.3 || .660 || .000 || .684 || 9.0 || 0.6 || 1.2 || 1.6 || 1.6 || 17.6
|-
| style="text-align:left;"| 2018–19
| style="text-align:left;"| Oregon
| 37 || 36 || 28.7 || .670 || .000 || .678 || 9.1 || 1.0 || 0.9 || 0.8 || 1.3 ||16.1
|-
| style="text-align:left;"| 2019–20*
| style="text-align:left;"| Oregon
| 33 || 33 || 28.7 || .685 || .000 || .695 || 9.6 || 1.5 || 1.0 || 1.1 || 1.5 || 17.3
|- class="sortbottom"
| style="text-align:center;" colspan="2"| Career
| 144 || 141 || 28.7 || .651 || .000 || .689 || 9.0 || 0.9 || 1.2 || 1.0 || 1.7 || 16.4

* 2020 NCAA tournament canceled due to COVID-19 pandemic

WNBA

Regular season

|-
| style="text-align:left;"|2020
| style="text-align:left;"|Chicago
| 22 || 6 || 14.5 || .682 || .000 || .750 || 3.9 || 0.3 || 0.5 || 0.4 || 0.7 || 5.7
|-
| style='text-align:left;background:#afe6ba;'|2021†
| style="text-align:left;"|Chicago
| 30 || 6 || 16.8 || .529 || .000 || .794 || 4.4 || 0.8 || 0.7 || 0.7 || 0.6 || 5.8
|-
| style="text-align:left;"|2022
| style="text-align:left;"|Chicago
| 24 || 0 || 9.7 || .510 || .000 || .750 || 1.7 || 0.5 || 0.3 || 0.1 || 0.5 || 2.3
|-
| style="text-align:left;"| Career
| style="text-align:left;"| 3 years, 1 team
| 76 || 12 || 13.9 || .574 || .000 || .778 || 3.4 || 0.6 || 0.5 || 0.4 || 0.6 || 4.7

Playoffs

|-
| style="text-align:left;"| 2020
| style="text-align:left;"| Chicago
| 1 || 1 || 18.0 || .500 || .000 || .000 || 2.0 || 0.0 || 0.0 || 1.0 || 2.0 || 4.0
|-
| style='text-align:left;background:#afe6ba;' |2021†
| style="text-align:left;"| Chicago
| 5 || 0 || 3.0 || 1.000 || .000 || .000 || 0.2 || 0.0 || 0.0 || 0.0 || 0.0 || 0.8
|-
| style="text-align:left;"| 2022
| style="text-align:left;"| Chicago
| 4 || 0 || 4.3 || .200 || .000 || .000 || 1.3 || 0.3 || 0.5 || 0.0 || 0.3 || 0.5
|-
| style="text-align:left;"| Career
| style="text-align:left;"| 3 years, 1 team
| 10 || 1 || 5.0 || .455 || .000 || .000 || 0.8 || 0.1 || 0.2 || 0.1 || 0.3 || 1.0

Overseas

National competition

Regular season

Playoffs

International competition

Regular season

References

1998 births
Living people
21st-century African-American sportspeople
African-American basketball players
All-American college women's basketball players
American women's 3x3 basketball players
American women's basketball players
Basketball players at the 2019 Pan American Games
Pan American Games 3x3 basketball players
Basketball players from Alaska
Basketball players from Chicago
Chicago Sky draft picks
Chicago Sky players
Medalists at the 2019 Pan American Games
Oregon Ducks women's basketball players
Pan American Games gold medalists for the United States
Pan American Games medalists in basketball
Power forwards (basketball)
Sportspeople from Fairbanks, Alaska
21st-century African-American women